Alburnus is a genus of fish in the family Cyprinidae, the carps and minnows. They are known commonly as bleaks. A group of species in the genus is known as shemayas.<ref name=Freyhof2007>{{cite journal |author1=Freyhof J. |author2=Kottelat M. | year = 2007 | title = Alburnus vistonicus, a new species of shemaya from eastern Greece, with remarks on Chalcalburnus chalcoides macedonicus from Lake Volvi (Teleostei: Cyprinidae) | url = http://www.pfeil-verlag.de/04biol/pdf/ief18_3_03.pdf | format = PDF | journal = Ichthyological Exploration of Freshwaters | volume = 18 | issue = 3| pages = 205–212 }}</ref> The genus occurs in the western Palearctic realm, and the center of diversity is in Turkey.

The genus Chalcalburnus is now part of Alburnus.

Species
Currently, 45 recognized species are placed in this genus:

 Alburnus adanensis Battalgazi, 1944 (Adana bleak)
 †Alburnus akili Battalgil, 1942 (Beyşehir bleak)
 Alburnus albidus O. G. Costa, 1838 (Italian bleak)
 Alburnus alburnus Linnaeus, 1758 (common bleak)
 Alburnus amirkabiri Mousavi-Sabet, Vatandoust, Khataminejad, Eagderi, Abbasi, M. Nasri, Jouladeh & Vasil'eva, 2015 
 Alburnus arborella Bonaparte, 1841 
 Alburnus atropatenae L. S. Berg, 1925
 Alburnus attalus Özuluğ & Freyhof, 2007 (Bakır shemaya) 
 Alburnus baliki Bogutskaya, Küçük & Ünlü, 2000 (Antalya bleak)
 Alburnus battalgilae Özuluğ & Freyhof, 2007 (Gediz shemaya) 
 Alburnus belvica Karaman, 1924
 Alburnus caeruleus Heckel, 1843 (black-spotted bleak)
 Alburnus carinatus Battalgil, 1941 (Manyas shemaya)
 Alburnus chalcoides Güldenstädt, 1772 (Danube bleak)
 †Alburnus danubicus Antipa, 1909
 Alburnus demiri Özuluğ & Freyhof, 2008 (eastern Aegean bleak) 
 Alburnus derjugini L. S. Berg, 1923 (Georgian shemaya)
 Alburnus doriae De Filippi, 1865
 Alburnus escherichii Steindachner, 1897 (Sakarya bleak)
 Alburnus filippii Kessler, 1877 (Kura bleak)
 Alburnus heckeli Battalgil, 1943 (Hazar bleak)
 Alburnus hohenackeri Kessler, 1877 (North Caucasian bleak)
 Alburnus istanbulensis Battalgil, 1941
 Alburnus kotschyi Steindachner, 1863 (Arsuz bleak)
 Alburnus leobergi Freyhof & Kottelat, 2007 
 Alburnus macedonicus Karaman, 1928
 Alburnus mandrensis Drensky, 1943
 Alburnus mento Heckel, 1837
 Alburnus mentoides Kessler, 1859
 Alburnus mossulensis Heckel, 1843 (Mossul bleak)
 Alburnus nasreddini Battalgil, 1943 
 Alburnus neretvae Buj, Šanda & Perea, 2010 
 †Alburnus nicaeensis Battalgil, 1941 (İznik shemaya)
 Alburnus orontis Sauvage, 1882 
 Alburnus qalilus Krupp, 1992 
 Alburnus sarmaticus Freyhof & Kottelat, 2007
 Alburnus schischkovi Drensky, 1943 (Black Sea bleak)
 Alburnus scoranza Heckel & Kner, 1858
 Alburnus selcuklui M. Elp, F. Şen & Özuluğ, 2015 
 Alburnus sellal Heckel, 1843 (Sellal bleak)
 Alburnus tarichi Güldenstädt, 1814 
 Alburnus thessalicus Stephanidis, 1950 
 Alburnus timarensis Kuru, 1980
 Alburnus vistonicus Freyhof & Kottelat, 2007 
 Alburnus volviticus Freyhof & Kottelat, 2007
 Alburnus zagrosensis'' Coad, 2009

References

 
Cyprinidae genera
Taxa named by Constantine Samuel Rafinesque
Taxonomy articles created by Polbot